Bear Mountain, formerly Goldmine Mountain, is a ski area established in 1969, in the San Bernardino National Forest in Southern California United States. It is located by Big Bear Lake, two miles apart from its sister mountain, Snow Summit; these two ski areas operate under the same management and are collectively known as Big Bear Mountain Resort (BBMR). The resort is part of Alterra Mountain Company.

Resort
Bear Mountain comprises three main peaks: Bear Peak, Silver Mountain, and Goldmine Mountain. With an average of 100 in (250 cm) of natural snowfall, the mountain relies heavily on artificial snowmaking, as do nearly all other ski resorts in Southern California. Since establishing the first freestyle park in the early 1990s, Bear Mountain has continued to be a leading innovator in freestyle ski and snowboarding, along with terrain park building. The mountain contains one of the few Superpipes in Southern California and given sufficient natural snow, its tree runs are open for skiing and snowboarding, unlike those at Snow Summit. Even territory normally "out of bounds" off of Chair 8 has opened after heavy snow. 

For decades, Snow Summit and Goldmine mountain operated independently, as fierce rivals.  In 1988, S.K.I. ski area operating company bought Goldmine, changing its name to Bear Mountain. In 2002 Snow Summit purchased Bear Mountain and developed Big Bear Mountain Resorts, allowing skiers and snowboarders to use a single ticket at both resorts. Snow Summit's Richard "Dick" Kun led the move to focus Bear Mountain upon snowboarders, to draw them away from Snow Summit and thereby attune it once more to the culture of the dedicated skier and families. Bear Mountain acquired the nickname "The Park" because most of it comprises irregular terrain.

In 2017, Bear Mountain was acquired by a joint venture that became Alterra Mountain Company.

Bear Mountain trails

References

External links

 Alterra Mountain Company
 Ski areas and resorts in California
 Sports venues in San Bernardino County, California
 San Bernardino Mountains
 San Bernardino National Forest